is a 2021 Japanese film. It is the sequel to the first film adaptation of the manga series Kaguya-sama: Love is War.

The film was released in theaters on August 20, 2021, topping the box office for its release weekend.

Cast
Sho Hirano as Miyuki Shirogane
Kanna Hashimoto as Kaguya Shinomiya
Hayato Sano as Yū Ishigami
Nana Asakawa as Chika Fujiwara
Mayu Hotta as Ai Hayasaka
Yūka Kageyama as Miko Iino
Haruka Fukuhara as Tsubame Koyasu
Shun'ya Itabashi as Kazeno
Fumiya Takahashi as Kō Ogino
Natsumi Ikema as Nagisa Kashiwagi
Yūtarō as Tsubasa Tanuma
Masahiro Takashima as Miyuki's father
Jiro Sato as Shōzō Tanuma

References

External links 

 

Kaguya-sama: Love Is War
2021 films
2020s high school films
2021 romantic comedy films
2020s teen films
Japanese high school films
Japanese romantic comedy films
Live-action films based on manga
Manga adapted into films
Toho films